An oligoester is an ester oligomer chain containing a small number of repeating ester units (monomers).  Oligoesters are short analogs of polymeric polyesters.

An example is oligo-(R)-3-hydroxybutyrate.

See also
 Oligopeptide

References

Carboxylate esters
Polyesters